¡Basta Ya! is a Spanish grassroots organization.

Basta Ya may also refer to:
Basta Ya, a 2006 album by Atahualpa Yupanqui
Basta Ya... Revolución, a 1971 album by Roy Brown 
Basta Ya (Atahualpa Yupanqui song)
"¡Basta Ya!" (song) a song by Marco Antonio Solís, recorded by a number of performers
"Basta Ya", a song by Ricky Martin from the album Música + Alma + Sexo
"Basta Ya (Pop Version)", a song by Tito El Bambino from the album El Patrón: Invencible